Events from the year 1156 in Ireland.

Incumbents
 High King: Toirdelbach Ua Conchobair (died) then Muirchertach Mac Lochlainn

Events
 Ruaidrí Ua Conchobair becomes King of Connacht

Births

Deaths
Tairrdelbach Ua Conchobair (Turlough O’Connor), who had reigned as King of Connacht since 1106 and was a claimant to the High Kingship of Ireland. He was buried in Clonmacnoise.

References